Grylloblatta is a genus of insects in the family Grylloblattidae. It contains 15 species, including Grylloblatta chirurgica, almost exclusively from high-altitude and high-latitude regions of the United States, living in ice caves and glaciers.

The genus was first described by Edmund Walker in 1914, based on a single species, Grylloblatta campodeiformis.

Species
These 15 species belong to the genus Grylloblatta:
 Grylloblatta barberi Caudell, 1924 i c g
 Grylloblatta bifratrilecta Gurney, 1953 i c g b
 Grylloblatta campodeiformis E. M. Walker, 1914 i c g b (northern rock crawler)
 Grylloblatta chandleri Kamp, 1963 i c g
 Grylloblatta chintimini Marshall & Lytle, 2015 i c g b
 Grylloblatta chirurgica Gurney, 1961 i c g b (Mount St Helens' grylloblattid)
 Grylloblatta gurneyi Kamp, 1963 i c g
 Grylloblatta marmoreus Schoville, 2012 i c g
 Grylloblatta newberryensis Marshall and Lytle, 2015 i c g
 Grylloblatta oregonensis Schoville, 2012 i c g
 Grylloblatta rothi Gurney, 1953 i c g
 Grylloblatta scudderi Kamp, 1979 i c g
 Grylloblatta sculleni Gurney, 1937 i c g
 Grylloblatta siskiyouensis Schoville, 2012 i c g
 Grylloblatta washoa Gurney, 1961 i c g
Data sources: i = ITIS, c = Catalogue of Life, g = GBIF, b = Bugguide.net

Novel species
Based on genetic studies and other evidence, Schoville (2013) identifies the following as potential new species.

Grylloblatta sp. "South Ice Cave" – Deschutes County
Grylloblatta sp. "Glacier Peak"
Grylloblatta sp. "Mount Rainier"
Grylloblatta sp. "Sawyer's Ice Cave 1" – Linn County and Yakima County
Grylloblatta sp. "Sawyer's Ice Cave 2" – Linn County
Grylloblatta sp. "Trout Lake Caves" – Klickitat County
Grylloblatta sp. "Central Sierra Nevada" – Sixty Lake Basin, Fresno County
Grylloblatta sp. "Tioga Crest" – Yosemite National Park and Inyo National Forest
Grylloblatta sp. "Graveyard Lake" – Sierra National Forest
Grylloblatta sp. "Ostrander Lake" – Yosemite National Park
Grylloblatta sp. "Southwest Sierra Nevada" – Sequoia National Park and environs
Grylloblatta sp. "Lilburn cave" – Sequoia National Park
Grylloblatta sp. "Trinity Mountains" – Shasta–Trinity National Forest
Grylloblatta sp. nov. "Olympic Mountains" – Olympic National Forest, near The Brothers
Grylloblatta sp. "Mount Spokane"
Grylloblatta sp. "Polaris Peak" – Coeur d'Alene National Forest

Life cycle
Individuals have lifespans of between 6 to 10 years.

References

Grylloblattidae
Insects of the United States
Taxa named by Edmund Murton Walker
Taxonomy articles created by Polbot
Psychrophiles